was a planned Autobahn in Germany, supposed to connect Schwäbisch Hall with Ravensburg via Backnang, Stuttgart, Metzingen and Riedlingen. Its construction has been postponed.

Exit list 

 

 
|-
|colspan="3"|

| built as 

|----
|colspan="3" style="background-color:#ddd;"|  unterbrochen, weiterer Bedarf

|-
|colspan="3"|

| built as 

 

  
 
 

|}

External links 

85
A085
Proposed roads in Germany

de:Liste der Bundesautobahnen in Deutschland#A 80 bis A 89